Aumeisteri Manor, also called Cirgaļi Manor, is a manor house built by Baron Johann von Wulf in the historical region of Vidzeme, northern Latvia, after 1750 and reconstructed in 1793.

See also
List of palaces and manor houses in Latvia

References

External links
 Aumeisteri (Aumeistari) Manor 

Manor houses in Latvia